President of the Court of Appeal may refer to:

 President of the Court of Appeal (Ireland)
 President of the New South Wales Court of Appeal
 President of the Queensland Court of Appeal
 President of the Court of Appeal of Sri Lanka